Endangered Girls (German: Gefährdete Mädchen) is a 1928 Austrian silent drama film directed by Hans Otto and starring Max Landa, Cilly Feindt and Hermine Sterler

Cast
 Max Landa
 Cilly Feindt
 Hermine Sterler
 Margot Landa
 Leon Epp
 Hans Mierendorff
 Viktor Franz
 Livio Pavanelli
 Albert von Kersten
 Fritz Spira 
 Karl Noll

References

Bibliography
 Robert Von Dassanowsky. Austrian Cinema: A History. McFarland, 2005.

External links

1928 films
Austrian silent feature films
Austrian drama films
Films directed by Hans Otto
1928 drama films
Silent drama films
1920s German-language films